Trout Creek is an unincorporated community, in far western Juab County, Utah, United States.

Description

The community is located along the Pony Express/Overland route in northern Snake Valley, north of Partoun and south of Callao. It is named after the creek that flows from the west off of the Deep Creek Mountains. The West Desert High School of the Tintic School District (the smallest secondary school in the state) is located within the community and it has one of the most remote LDS Church chapels in Utah (with a short section of paved road, the only paved road for over ).

The Zip Code is 84083.

See also

References

External links

Unincorporated communities in Juab County, Utah
Unincorporated communities in Utah
Provo–Orem metropolitan area